TOBB Towers are 34 floor and 140 meters tall twin towers owned by Union of Chambers and Commodity Exchanges of Turkey on İsmet İnönü Boulevard in Ankara, Turkey. By 2020, they are still one of the tallest buildings in Ankara.

References 

Skyscrapers in Turkey
Twin towers
Modernist architecture in Turkey
2001 establishments in Turkey